Bear River 6A is a 31.2ha Mi'kmaq reserve located in Annapolis County, Nova Scotia. It is administratively part of the Bear River First Nation.

References

Indian reserves in Nova Scotia
Communities in Annapolis County, Nova Scotia
Mi'kmaq in Canada